Franco Sacchetti (c. 1335 – c. 1400), was an Italian poet and novelist.

Biography

Born in Florence or in Ragusa (modern Dubrovnik), he was the son of Benci di Uguccione, surnamed "Buono", a Florentine merchant of the noble and ancient family of the Sacchetti. He was married three times; first to Maria Felice Strozzi with whom he had two sons, Filippo and Niccolo. Franco’s second wife was Ghita di Piero Gherardini, his third wife was Giovanna di Francesco Bruni. He was the brother of Giannozzo Sacchetti, a follower of Catherine of Siena, who was executed following the Ciompi Revolt.  While still a young man he achieved repute as a poet, and he appears to have traveled on affairs of more or less importance as far as to Genoa, Milan and Slavonia.

After 1363 he settled in Florence. When a sentence of banishment was passed upon the rest of the house of Sacchetti by the Florentine authorities in 1380 (after the Ciompi revolt) it appears that Sacchetti was expressly exempted, per esser tanto uomo buono ("because he is a very good man"), and in 1383 he was one of the eight, discharging the office of prior for the months of March and April.

In 1386 he was chosen ambassador to Genoa, but preferred to go as podestà to Bibbiena in Casentino. In 1392 he was podestà of San Miniato, and in 1396 he held a similar office at Faenza. In 1398 he received from his fellow-citizens the post of captain of their then province of Romagna, having his residence at Portico. The date of his death is unknown; most probably it occurred about 1400, though some writers place it as late as 1410.

He wrote sonnets, canzoni, madrigals, and other poems; his best known works are however his Novelle (short stories). They were originally 300 in number, but today only 258 remain, the rest having been lost. They were not fitted into any framework like that of Boccaccio's Decameron. The best of them are of a humorous character; and their style is more simple and colloquial than Boccaccio's. The story given as a specimen probably exists (under one form or another) in the folk tales of every European nation.

Sacchetti died at San Miniato around 1400.

He has been defined as an author of Proto-Morlachism, a purported early stage of Morlachism.

See also 

 Florence
 Early Italian Renaissance
 Renaissance humanism
 Republic of Florence
 Republic of Ragusa

References 

Attribution:

Sources 
 
 

1330s births
1400s deaths
Italian poets
Italian male poets
Italian novelists
14th-century people of the Republic of Florence
Writers from Florence
Italian male novelists